Archbishop Curley-Notre Dame High School was a private, Roman Catholic high school in the Buena Vista neighborhood of Miami, Florida, United States. It was located in and operated by the Roman Catholic Archdiocese of Miami.

On September 27, 2016, the Archdiocese of Miami announced that, due to continued dwindling enrollment, the school would close in August 2017. The school was merged with Monsignor Edward Pace High School, in Miami Gardens, at the start of the 2017–2018 academic year.

History
In 1953, the Roman Catholic Diocese of Saint Augustine (which, on October 7, 1958, became the Roman Catholic Diocese of Miami, under Bishop Joseph Patrick Hurley) created two new Catholic high schools. Archbishop Curley High School (for boys) and Notre Dame Academy (for girls), were founded in 1953, in Miami, Florida. Archbishop Curley High School was initially administered by diocesan priests from 1953 to 1959, followed by the Congregation of the Brothers of the Holy Cross from 1960 to 1970, and again by diocesan priests from 1970 until 1985. Notre Dame Academy was originally administered by the Sisters of Saint Joseph of Saint Augustine from 1953 to 1959. From 1960 to 1981 the Sisters, Servants of the Immaculate Heart of Mary administered Notre Dame Academy.
 
The two schools merged in 1981 onto the Archbishop Curley High School campus to form coeducational Archbishop Curley-Notre Dame High School. From 1985 the school was administered by the Congregation of Christian Brothers.

At the start of the 1960–61 school year, five black students left all-black Holy Redeemer, encouraged to do so by nuns. Three male students enrolled at Archbishop Curley, and two female students enrolled at Notre Dame.

Activities

Anime Club
Art Club
Band/Orchestra - Troubadours
Book Club
Campus Ministry
Chess Team
Choir - Knightingales Concert & Show Choir
Cooking Club
Ecology Club
Edmund Rice Community
English Honor Society
Gamer Association
Knightly News - Morning Announcements
Knights for Life
Ladies of Distinction
Men of Honor
Mock Trial
Movie Critic Club
National Honor Society
Newspaper - Knight Times
Soldiers' Angels/Support Our Troops
Spanish Honor Society
Speech and Debate
Student Government
Yearbook

Athletics

Sports by season:

Fall
 Cheer Leading  
 Cross Country (coed)  
 Football  
 Volleyball  
 Golf 
Winter
 Basketball (boys)
 Basketball (girls)
 Cheer Leading
 Soccer (boys)
 Soccer (girls)
 Wrestling
Spring
 Baseball
 Softball
 Tennis (boys)
 Tennis (girls)
 Track & Field (coed)

Notable alumni

Bobby Allison - former NASCAR driver
Cecilia Altonaga - United States District Court Judge
Fran Curci - former head football coach of the University of Miami and the University of Kentucky
Charley Diamond - American Football League player
Bill Frohbose - former NFL player
Jorge Gonzáles - CEO and President of City National Bank of Florida
Carlos M. Hernández - Retired CEO of Fluor Corporation, Board Member, PG&E and Steward Health Care
Dudley Hart - professional golfer
Mark Hurd - Co-CEO Oracle; former Chairman, CEO and President of Hewlett Packard
Carroll Williams - American player of gridiron football; teacher and principal in Dade County Public School District
Betty Wright - Grammy winning Miami-based soul and R&B singer-songwriter

Notes and references

Further reading
 
 
 https://www.asumag.com/facilities-management/business-finance/article/20853419/2-catholic-high-schools-in-miami-area-will-merge

External links
 

Catholic secondary schools in Florida
Schools in Miami
Educational institutions established in 1953
Educational institutions established in 1981
Congregation of Christian Brothers secondary schools
Private high schools in Miami-Dade County, Florida
Private middle schools in Miami-Dade County, Florida
1953 establishments in Florida